Tropix is a 2002 independent film directed by Costa Rica-based Americans Percy Angress and Livia Linden. The film is one of the few independent films made in Costa Rica. It was released in the US on DVD in 2004. It was filmed in Guápiles, and San José. The film stars Danielle Bisutti, Ryan Barton-Grimley, and Keith Brunsmann.

References

2002 films
Costa Rican drama films